The Wellington River is a perennial river of the West Gippsland catchment, located in the Alpine region of the Australian state of Victoria.

Features and location
The Wellington River rises below The Sentinels within the Snowy Range of the Great Dividing Range. The river descends  over its  course.

See also

Rivers of Victoria

References

External links
 
 

West Gippsland catchment
Rivers of Gippsland (region)
Victorian Alps